Christina Chanée (born 6 January 1979, Christina Ratchanée Birch Wongskul) is a Danish-Thai pop singer who won the Dansk Melodi Grand Prix 2010 with Tomas N'evergreen, with the song "In a Moment Like This".

Chanée lives in Frederiksberg, Copenhagen with Agil Gaytaranov, a risk manager with BP whom she met while he was studying his master's degree in the Technical University of Dortmund, Germany.

References

External links

Christina Chanée on Myspace
Christina Chanée at Facebook

1979 births
Living people
Danish pop singers
Eurovision Song Contest entrants of 2010
Eurovision Song Contest entrants for Denmark
Dansk Melodi Grand Prix contestants
Dansk Melodi Grand Prix winners
Danish people of Thai descent
People from Odense
21st-century Danish  women singers